Cottoy is a surname. Notable people with the surname include:

Jevon Cottoy (born 1996), Canadian football player 
Keron Cottoy (born 1989), Vincentian cricketer

See also
Cotto (name)
Cotton (surname)